Marsaskala Sports Club is a waterpolo club from Marsaskala, Malta. The club was founded in 1927.

For sponsorship reasons, the club is currently known as Marsaskala Fish and Fish.

History
Up until 1972, there was a Marsascala Aquatic Sports Club which however was "dissolved due to internal conflicts".

Current squad
As at June 15, 2021:
 Jurgen Micallef
 Jean Claude Cutajar
 Kyle Navarro
 Jake Ciantar
 Gian Luca Galea
 Paul privitera
 Ayrton Camenzuli 
 Mark Carani
 Malcolm Manara
 Raoul Greco
 Aidan Muscat
 Dalton Camilleri
 Gerald Sammut
 Luca Felice
 Stephen Micallef
Head Coach:  Arpad Babay

References

External links
Official Website

Water polo clubs in Malta
Sports clubs established in 1927
1927 establishments in Malta
Marsaskala